Patriotic Rally for the Renewal of the Central African Republic (RPRC) was an armed group in the Central African Republic based in northern part of the country, in Ouadda and Sam Ouandja in Haute-Kotto and Tiringoulou in Vakaga.

History 

RPRC was formed in November 2014 as a split faction from FPRC armed group. It was initially based in Bria. In October 2016 RPRC created coalition together with FPRC, MPC and Anti-balaka against UPC. In June 2017, infighting broke out between RPRC and FPRC leading to distancing between those two groups. In May 2018 RPRC formally reconciled with UPC armed group. As of 2018, RPRC reportedly controlled Bria-Ouadda road, maintaining checkpoints alongside the road and taxing import 1,400$ and export 25,000$.

In February 2019, RPRC was one of the signatories of peace agreement with the government. On 28 May 2019 splinter group from RPRC, Party of the Rally of the Central African Nation, was created.

In March 2020, RPRC together with MLCJ attacked N'Délé, stronghold of FPRC. On 11 March 2020, more than 40 civilians were killed in attack on N'Délé. On 29 April, RPRC and MLCJ once again attacked N'Délé killing 37 civilians. They were eventually forced to withdraw on 10 May. On 19 May, MINUSCA arrested nine RPRC fighters in N'Délé including general Azor Kalité while they were trying to escape to Tirigoulou. They were transferred two days later to Bangui. They have been accused of war crimes and crimes against humanity. On 25 May, MINUSCA arrested two RPRC fighters 16 km from N'Délé followed by another two days later including general Amar.

On 12 February 2022, the group's leader, Damane Zakaria, together with 20 other RPRC fighters, was killed by Russian mercenaries in Ouadda. On 4 December 2022 official dissolution of the group was signed in Bangui.

References 

Factions of the Central African Republic Civil War
Rebel groups in the Central African Republic
Rebel groups that actively control territory